Sunākste Parish is an administrative unit of Aizkraukle Municipality in the Selonia region of Latvia.

Towns, villages and settlements of Sunākste Parish 
Lielsunākste
Mazsunākste 
Pikslauki 
Sunākste 
Zilkalne

Parishes of Latvia
Aizkraukle Municipality
Selonia